The Hon Montague Browne (Henry Montague Browne; 3 October 1799–24 November 1884) was Dean of Lismore from 1850 until 1884.

He was the second son of James Browne, 2nd Baron Kilmaine. He began his ecclesiastical career with a curacy at Christ Church Cathedral, Waterford. After that he was Rector of Shanrahan then Clonmel.

He married Catherine Penelope de Montmorency, daughter of Lodge Evans de Montmorency, 1st Viscount Frankfort de Montmorency. Their fourth child and second daughter, Augusta, married Lieutenant-General Arthur Cavendish-Bentinck and was the first Baroness Bolsover.

References

Alumni of Trinity College Dublin
Deans of Lismore
1799 births
1884 deaths